Duke of Camiña is a hereditary title in the Peerage of Spain accompanied by the dignity of Grandee, granted in 1619 by Philip III to a Portuguese aristocrat, Miguel de Meneses, 2nd Duke of Vila Real in the peerage of Portugal.

The title makes reference to the town of Caminha, Portugal, and was granted originally by Philip III as a title of Portuguese nobility, as he was also king of Portugal. When the two countries were separated, Philip IV of Spain recognised the Dukedom of Camiña as a title in the peerage of Spain.

Dukes of Camiña (1619)

Miguel de Meneses y Noronha, 1st Duke of Camiña
Miguel Luis de Meneses y Noronha, 2nd Duke of Camiña
María Beatriz de Meneses y Noronha, 3rd Duchess of Camiña
Pedro Damián Portocarrero y Meneses, 4th Duke of Camiña
Luisa Feliciana Portocarrero y Meneses, 5th Duchess of Camiña
Guillén Ramón de Moncada y Portocarrero, 6th Duke of Camiña
María Teresa de Moncada y Benavides, 7th Duchess of Camiña
Pedro de Alcántara Fernández de Córdoba y Moncada, 8th Duke of Camiña
Luis María Fernández de Córdoba y Gonzaga, 9th Duke of Camiña
Luis Joaquín Fernández de Córdoba y Benavides, 10th Duke of Camiña
Luis Antonio Fernández de Córdoba y Ponce de León, 11th Duke of Camiña
Luis María Fernández de Córdoba y Pérez de Barradas, 12th Duke of Camiña
Luis Jesús Fernández de Córdoba y Salabert, 13th Duke of Camiña
Victoria Eugenia Fernández de Córdoba y Fernández de Henestrosa, 14th Duchess of Camiña
Victoria de Hohenlohe-Langenburg y Schmidt-Polex, 15th Duchess of Camiña

See also
List of dukes in the peerage of Spain
List of current Grandees of Spain

References

Dukedoms of Spain
Grandees of Spain
Lists of dukes
Lists of Spanish nobility